Lan Na, or Lanna, was a kingdom in northern Thailand from the 13th to 18th centuries.

Lanna may also refer to:

Lanna people, or Northern Thai, an ethnic group native to the former kingdom
Lanna language, or Northern Thai language, spoken in the area of the former kingdom
Lanna script, or Tai Tham, a script used for languages of the region
Northern Thailand, the center of the former kingdom called Lanna

Places
Lanna, Lekeberg, Sweden
Lanna, Värnamo, Sweden
Länna, a locality in Uppsala County, Sweden

People
Lanna (given name)
Lanna (surname)

Other uses
6928 Lanna, a main-belt asteroid
Vila Lanna, a neo-Renaissance building in Prague, Czech Republic

See also
 Lana (disambiguation)
 Lanner (disambiguation)
 Nalan (disambiguation) or Na-lan